Faisal Jassim  (born 1 October 1991) is an Iraqi professional footballer who currently plays for Al-Shorta in the Iraqi Premier League.

International debut
On November 17, 2015 Faisal Jassim made his first international cap with Iraq against Chinese Taipei in a friendly match.

Honours

Club
Al-Shorta
 Iraqi Premier League: 2018–19, 2021–22
 Iraqi Super Cup: 2019, 2022

References

External links
 

Iraqi footballers
1991 births
Living people
Iraq international footballers
Al-Quwa Al-Jawiya players
Al-Mina'a SC players
People from Samawah
Association football fullbacks
Al-Shorta SC players